Vladimir Strizhevsky (1892–1970) was an actor, screenwriter and film director. He was born in the Russian Empire and later emigrated to France and Germany, where he worked for Joseph N. Ermolieff's Films Albatros and collaborated often with other Russian exiles.

Selected filmography
 The House of Mystery (1923)
 Taras Bulba (1924)
 The Adjutant of the Czar (1929)
 The Ring of the Empress (1930)
 Troika (1930)
 Sergeant X (1932)
 Crime and Punishment (1935)
 The Volga Boatman (1936)
 Nights of Princes (1938)

References

Bibliography
 Geoffrey Nowell-Smith. The Oxford History of World Cinema. Oxford University Press, 1996.

External links

1892 births
1970 deaths
Male film actors from the Russian Empire
Film directors from the Russian Empire
White Russian emigrants to Germany
People who emigrated to escape Bolshevism
Male screenwriters
Writers from the Russian Empire